Gunnebo may refer to:
 Gunnebo, a Swedish town
 Gunnebo House, a château in Sweden
 Gunnebo Security Group, a multinational corporation